Saragyol is a royal residence in Bulgaria. It is located on Rila mountain.
Saragyol is located within the National Park "Rila".

History
It was built by Ferdinand I between 1912 and 1914.
After the fall of the monarchy Sitnyakovo was used by the Fish-Hunting Union.

This royal residence was returned to Tsar Simeon II in 2002 after he became Prime Minister. In 2014 a court decision overturned this.

External links
www.novinite.com

Royal residences in Bulgaria
Palaces in Bulgaria
Borovets